The N-II or N-2 was a derivative of the American Delta rocket, produced under licence in Japan. It replaced the N-I-rocket in Japanese use. It used a Thor-ELT first stage, a Delta-F second stage, nine Castor SRMs, and on most flights either a Star-37E or Burner-2 upper stage, identical to the US Delta 0100 series configurations. Eight were launched between 1981 and 1987, before it was replaced by the H-I, which featured Japanese-produced upper stages. All eight launches were successful.

Launch history

See also
Comparison of orbital launchers families
Delta rocket
H-I
H-II
H-IIA
N-I rocket
PGM-17 Thor

References

Mitsubishi Heavy Industries space launch vehicles
Thor (rocket family)
Vehicles introduced in 1981
Japan–United States relations